Maciel Lima Barbosa da Cunha (born 29 November 1978), known simply as Maciel, is a Brazilian footballer who plays for Associação Desportiva Cabofriense as a forward.

He spent the vast majority of his professional career in Portugal, amassing Primeira Liga totals of 149 games and 36 goals over the course of seven seasons, mostly for União de Leiria (five years). He also had spells in the country with Porto and Braga.

Football career
Maciel was born in Caxias do Sul, Rio Grande do Sul. After beginning professionally with modest Bangu Atlético Clube and Volta Redonda Futebol Clube, he moved to Portugal in the 2001 summer, signing with U.D. Leiria and impressing well enough (22 goals in two full seasons) to eventually draw attention from Primeira Liga club FC Porto, which purchased the player in the 2004 January transfer window.

Maciel contributed significantly to the team's domestic supremacy renewal, appearing in 18 games and scoring three times. He could not participate, however, in its victorious campaign in the UEFA Champions League, being cup-tied for having played with Leiria in the season's UEFA Cup.

Under contract with Porto until the 2007 summer, Maciel would only appear twice in competitive matches until the end of his link, one of them a 1–1 home draw against former side Leiria in September 2004. He would be loaned in quick succession Clube Atlético Paranaense, Leiria and S.C. Braga, amassing a further 50 appearances with eight goals in Portugal's top level for the latter two. Subsequently, he signed permanently for Leiria, producing a disastrous campaign at all levels – only eight matches, no goals and club relegation, as last.

After nearly seven consecutive years in the same nation, Maciel left for Skoda Xanthi F.C. in Greece, in another unassuming spell. He then returned to his Brazil with lowly Associação Desportiva Cabofriense and Angra dos Reis Esporte Clube; in January 2010 he rejoined his very first professional club Volta Redonda, netting twice in his first three matches in the Campeonato Carioca.

Maciel played the remainder of his career in his country's lower leagues, including several spells with Madureira Esporte Clube.

References

External links

1978 births
Living people
Brazilian footballers
Association football forwards
Campeonato Brasileiro Série A players
Bangu Atlético Clube players
Volta Redonda FC players
Club Athletico Paranaense players
Associação Desportiva Cabofriense players
Madureira Esporte Clube players
Macaé Esporte Futebol Clube players
Primeira Liga players
U.D. Leiria players
FC Porto players
S.C. Braga players
Super League Greece players
Xanthi F.C. players
Brazilian expatriate footballers
Expatriate footballers in Portugal
Expatriate footballers in Greece
Brazilian expatriate sportspeople in Portugal